Necrotizing vasculitis, also called systemic necrotizing vasculitus, is a category of vasculitis, comprising vasculitides that present with necrosis.

Examples include giant cell arteritis, microscopic polyangiitis, and granulomatosis with polyangiitis.

ICD-10 uses the variant "necrotizing vasculopathy". ICD-9, while classifying these conditions together, does not use a dedicated phrase, instead calling them "polyarteritis nodosa and allied conditions".

When using the influential classification known as the "Chapel Hill Consensus Conference", the terms "systemic vasculitis" or "primary systemic vasculitides" are commonly used. Although the word necrotizing is omitted, the conditions described are largely the same.

Classification

Large vessel vasculitis
Giant-cell arteritis and Takayasu's arteritis have much in common, but usually affect patients of different ages, with Takayasu's arteritis affecting younger people, and giant-cell arteritis having a later age of onset.

Aortitis can also be considered a large-vessel disease.

Takayasu arteritis. Primarily affects the aorta and its main branches. At least three out of six criteria yields sensitivity and specificity of 90.5 and 97.8%:

 Onset < 40 years affects young and middle -aged women (ages 15–45)
 Claudication of extremities
 Decreased pulsation of one or both brachial arteries
 At least 10 mmHg systolic difference in both arms
 Bruit over one or both carotid arteries or abdominal aorta
 Arteriographic narrowing of aorta, its primary branches, or large arteries in upper or lower extremities
 Ocular manifestation
 Visual loss or field defects
 Retinal hemorrhages
 Neurological abnormalities
 Treatment: steroids
Giant cell (temporal) arteritis. Chronic vasculitis of both large and medium vessels, primarily affecting cranial branches of the arteries arising from the aortic arch. At least three out of five criteria yields sensitivity and specificity of 95 and 91%: 
 Age at onset ≥ 50 years
 New onset headache with localized tenderness
 Temporal artery tenderness or decreased pulsation
 Elevated ESR ≥ 50 mm/hour Westergren
 Temporal artery biopsy showing vasculitis with mononuclear cell infiltrate or granulomatous inflammation, usually with multinucleated giant cells

Medium vessel vasculitis
These conditions are sometimes considered together with the small vessel vasculitides.

Polyarteritis nodosa (PAN). Systemic necrotizing vasculitis and aneurysm formation affecting both medium and small arteries. If only small vessels are affected, it is called microscopic polyangiitis, although it is more associated with granulomatosis with polyangiitis than to classic PAN. At least 3 out of 10 criteria yields sensitivity and specificity of 82 and 87%:

 Unexplained weight loss > 4 kg
 Livedo reticularis
 Testicular pain
 Myalgias, weakness
 Abdominal pain, diarrhea, and GI bleeding
 Mononeuropathy or polyneuropathy
 New onset diastolic blood pressure > 90 mmHg
 Elevated serum blood urea nitrogen (> 40 mg/dL) or serum creatinine (> 1.5 mg/dL)
 Hepatitis B infection
 Arteriographic abnormalities
 Arterial biopsy showing polymorphonuclear cells

Kawasaki disease. Usually in children (age<4), it affects large, medium, and small vessels, prominently the coronary arteries. Associated with a mucocutaneous lymph node syndrome. Diagnosis requires fever lasting five days or more with at least four out of five criteria:

 Bilateral conjunctival injection
 Injected or fissured lips, injected pharynx, or strawberry tongue
 Erythema of palms/soles, edema of hands/feet, periungual desquamation
 Polymorphous rash
 Cervical lymphadenopathy (at least one node > 1.5 cm)

Isolated cerebral vasculitis. Affects medium and small arteries over a diffuse CNS area, without symptomatic extracranial vessel involvement. Patients have CNS symptoms as well as cerebral vasculitis by angiography and leptomeningeal biopsy.

Small vessel vasculitis
There are several vasculitides that affect small vessels.

Pauci-immune
Granulomatosis with polyangiitis. Systemic vasculitis of medium and small arteries, including venules and arterioles. Produces granulomatous inflammation of the respiratory tracts and necrotizing, pauci-immune glomerulonephritis. Most common cause of saddle nose deformity in USA (nose flattened due to destruction of nasal septum by granulomatous inflammation). Almost all patients with granulomatosis with polyangiitis have c-antineutrophil cytoplasmic antibody, but not vice versa. Current treatment of choice is cyclophosphamide. At least two out of four criteria yields sensitivity and specificity of 88 and 92%.

 Nasal or oral inflammation (oral ulcers or purulent/bloody nasal discharge, may be painful)
 Abnormal chest X-ray with showing nodules, infiltrates, or cavities
 Microscopic hematuria or red blood cell casts
 Vessel biopsy shows granulomatous inflammation
Peak incidence: ages 40–60, males > females

Eosinophilic granulomatosis with polyangiitis (formerly known as Churg–Strauss syndrome). Affects medium and small vessels with vascular and extravascular granulomatosis. Classically involves arteries of lungs and skin, but may be generalized.  At least four criteria yields sensitivity and specificity of 85 and 99.7%.

 Asthma (history of wheezing or presently wheezing)
 Eosinophilia > 10% on complete blood count
 Mononeuropathy or polyneuropathy
 Migratory or transient pulmonary opacities on chest x-ray
 Paranasal sinus abnormalities
 Vessel biopsy showing eosinophils in extravascular areas

Microscopic polyarteritis/polyangiitis. Affects capillaries, venules, or arterioles. Thought to be part of a group that includes granulomatosis with polyangiitis since both are associated with antineutrophil cytoplasmic antibody and similar extrapulmonary manifestations. Patients do not usually have symptomatic or histologic respiratory involvement.

Immune complex
Hypersensitivity vasculitis (allergic vasculitis). Usually due to a hypersensitivity reaction to a known drug. Drugs most commonly implicated are penicillin, sulphonamides and thiazide diuretics. Methamphetamine and other sympathomimetics can cause a cerebral vasculitis alongside polyarteritis nodosa like systemic features. With other drugs,there is presence of skin vasculitis with palpable petechiae or purpura. Biopsy of these lesions reveal inflammation of the small vessels, termed leukocytoclastic vasculitis, which is most prominent in postcapillary venules. At least three out of five criteria yields sensitivity and specificity of 71 and 84%:

 Age > 16
 Use of possible triggering drug in relation to symptoms
 Palpable purpura
 Maculopapular rash
 Skin biopsy showing neutrophils around vessel

IgA vasculitis (formerly known as Henoch–Schonlein purpura). Systemic vasculitis due to tissue deposition of IgA-containing immune complexes. Biopsy of lesions shows inflammation of small vessels. It is considered a form of hypersensitivity vasculitis but is distinguished by prominent deposits of IgA. This is the most common vasculitis in children. Presence of three or more criteria yielded sensitivity of 87% while less than two criteria yielded hypersensitivity vasculitis in 74%:

 Palpable purpura (usually of buttocks and legs)
 Bowel angina
 GI bleed
 Hematuria
 Onset < 20 years
 No new medications

Essential cryoglobulinemic vasculitis. Most often due to hepatitis C infection, immune complexes of cryoglobulins – proteins that consists of immunoglobulins and complement and precipitate in the cold while dissolving upon rewarming – are deposited in walls of capillaries, venules, or arterioles. Therefore, complement will be low with histology showing vessel inflammation with immune deposits.

Other/ungrouped
Vasculitis secondary to connective tissue disorders. Usually secondary to systemic lupus erythematosus (SLE), rheumatoid arthritis (RA), relapsing polychondritis, Behçet's disease, and other connective tissue disorders.

Vasculitis secondary to viral infection. Usually due to hepatitis B and C, human immunodeficiency virus, cytomegalovirus, Epstein–Barr virus, and parvovirus B19.

Signs and symptoms
Patients usually present with systemic symptoms with single or multiorgan dysfunction. Common (and nonspecific) complaints include fatigue, weakness, fever, joint pains, abdominal pain, hypertension, chronic kidney disease, and neurologic dysfunction. The following symptoms should raise a strong suspicion of a vasculitis:

Mononeuritis multiplex. Also known as asymmetric polyneuropathy, in a non-diabetic this is suggestive of vasculitis.
Palpable purpura. If patients have this in isolation, it is most likely due to cutaneous leukocytoclastic vasculitis. If the purpura is in combination with systemic organ involvement, it is most likely to be Henoch–Schönlein purpura or microscopic polyangiitis.
Pulmonary-renal syndrome. Individuals who are coughing up blood and have kidney involvement are likely to have granulomatosis with polyangiitis, microscopic polyangiitis, or anti-GBM disease (Goodpasture syndrome).

Diagnosis
A detailed history is important to elicit any recent medications, any risk of hepatitis infection, or any recent diagnosis with a connective tissue disorder such as systemic lupus erythematosus (SLE). A thorough physical exam is needed as usual.

Lab tests. Basic lab tests may include a complete blood count, chemiestries (look for creatinine), creatine phosphokinase level, liver function tests, erythrocyte sedimentation rate, hepatitis serologies, urinalysis, chest X-ray, and an electrocardiogram. Additional, more specific tests include:
 Antinuclear antibody test can detect an underlying connective tissue disorder, especially lupus erythematosus
 Complement levels that are low can suggest mixed cryoglobulinemia, hepatitis C infection, and lupus erythematosus], but not most other vasculitides.
 Antineutrophil cytoplasmic antibody may suggest granulomatosis with polyangiitis, microscopic polyangiitis, eosinophilic granulomatosis with polyangiitis, or drug-induced vasculitis, but is not diagnostic.
Electromyography. It is useful if a systemic vasculitis is suspected and neuromuscular symptoms are present.
Arteriography. Arteriograms are helpful in vasculitis affecting the large and medium vessels but not helpful in small vessel vasculitis. Angiograms of mesenteric or renal arteries in polyarteritis nodosa may show aneurysms, occlusions, and vascular wall abnormalities. Arteriography are not diagnostic in itself if other accessible areas for biopsy are present. However, in Takayasu's arteritis, where the aorta may be involved, it is unlikely a biopsy will be successful and angiography can be diagnostic.
Tissue biopsy. This is the gold standard of diagnosis when it is taken from the most involved area.

Treatment
Treatment is targeted to the underlying cause. However, most vasculitis in general are treated with steroids (e.g., methylprednisolone) because the underlying cause of the vasculitis is due to hyperactive immunological damage. Immunosuppressants such as cyclophosphamide and azathioprine may also be given.

A systematic review of antineutrophil cytoplasmic antibody-positive vasculitis identified best treatments depending on whether the goal is to induce remission or maintenance and depending on severity of the vasculitis.

References

External links 

Vascular-related cutaneous conditions